The Greek Picnic is an annual week-long event during the month of July in Philadelphia, Pennsylvania. Originally designed as a reunion celebrating African American college fraternities and sororities, it later gained popularity among a large population that do not attend college due to its various popular social activities. "Sister" events also include the Greek Festival in Hampton, Virginia; The Atlanta Greek Picnic in Atlanta, Georgia; The Charlotte Greek Picnic in Charlotte, North Carolina; the Texas Greek Picnic in Houston, Texas, Nashville Greek Picnic in Nashville, Tennessee, the California Greek Picnic in Los Angeles, California and Bikers Week in Myrtle Beach, South Carolina.

History
The Philadelphia Greek Picnic was established in July 1975 at the Belmont Grove in Fairmount Park. The Philadelphia Greek Picnic continues to be the nation's oldest reunion for members of the historic nine African-American fraternities and sororities and people who appreciate and understand college and African American Greek-lettered life.

The Philadelphia Greek Picnic is co-sponsored by the City of Philadelphia, the Office of the Managing Director, the Fairmount Park Commission, the Philadelphia Police Department and the National Pan-Hellenic Council Inc. of Philadelphia. It is managed and coordinated by volunteers of the nine organizations wishing to make the entire week-long experience unforgettable based upon the themes of
Scholarship, Fellowship and Respect.

No picnic was planned in 2020 because of the COVID-19 pandemic. They resumed the next year.

Popularity
During the early to mid 1990s the picnic grew national notoriety, attracting college students and party-goers from all over the east coast of the United States. The primary festival held in Fairmount Park frequently registered an attendance of 100,000+ people, with another 100,000-200,000 people scattered across the city in support of the events. Also various hip-hop and R&B celebrities can be seen attending the events.

During the week the city receives a large economic boost due to tourism. Hotel and rental-car companies throughout Philadelphia, South Jersey, and Delaware are reserved weeks to months in advance and opportunities for price gouging as the event grows closer are prevalent.

In recent years, the event has grown smaller, quieter and less troublesome to the police as well as attendants due to restructuring by the event organizers.

Events
The usual events during the week of the Greek Picnic are as follows:

Day 0 Saturday- Books and Basketball Tournament, Acres of Diamonds
Day 1 Sunday- NPHC Worship Service, Cultural Arts Night
Day 3 Tuesday- Cultural Arts Night
Day 4 Wednesday- Stop the Violence Urban Dance Competition
Day 5 Thursday- Comedy Show
Day 6 Friday- President's Reception
Day 7 Saturday- Stompfest Online's National Stepshow, Fairmount Park Festival
Day 8 Sunday- Hair and Fashion Showcase

See also

Unity Day (Philadelphia)

African Americans and education
African-American festivals
Festivals in Philadelphia
West Philadelphia
1974 establishments in Pennsylvania
Recurring events established in 1974